Passaglia is a surname and may refer to the following people:

Carlo Passaglia (1812–1887), Italian Jesuit
Augusto Passaglia (born 1838), Italian sculptor
Marty Passaglia (born 1919), American basketball player
Lui Passaglia (born 1954), Canadian football player
Juan Pablo Passaglia (born 1989), Argentine football player